Susitna may refer to any of:
 Susitna Glacier
 The Susitna River in Alaska 
 Mount Susitna, a mountain near the Susitna River in Alaska
 The Matanuska-Susitna Valley through which the Susitna River runs
 The Matanuska-Susitna Borough, a political subdivision in Alaska
 Susitna, Alaska, a census-designated place in the valley on the river
 MV Susitna, a ship built for the proposed Knik Arm ferry in Alaska